Epargyreus is the genus of flasher butterflies, in the subfamily Eudaminae of skipper butterflies. The species are found in the Nearctic and Neotropical realms.

Taxonomy

Etymology
The genus name is derived from Greek argyros "silver",  referring to the white spot on the ventral hindwing.

Species
The following species are recognised in the genus Epargyreus:
 Epargyreus antaeus (Hewitson, 1867) - Jamaica
 Epargyreus aspina Evans, 1952 - Mexico, Colombia
 Epargyreus barisses (Hewitson, 1874) - Brazil
 E. barisses barisses (Hewitson, 1874) - Bolivia, Peru
 E. barisses argentina Mabille, 1903 - Argentina
 Epargyreus brodkorbi Freeman, 1969 - Mexico
 Epargyreus clarus (Cramer, [1775]) – silver-spotted skipper – Canada to South America
 E. clarus clarus (Cramer, [1775]) - southern Canada, U.S., Mexico
 E. clarus huachuca  Dixon, 1955 - Mexico, Arizona
 E. clarus californicus MacNeill, 1975 - British Columbia to California, Mexico
 E. clarus profugus Austin, 1998 
 Epargyreus clavicornis (Herrich-Schäffer, 1869)
 E. clavicornis clavicornis (Herrich-Schäffer, 1869) - Central America
 E. clavicornis gaumeri  Godman & Salvin, 1893 - Honduras
 E. clavicornis tenda Evans, 1955 - Mexico, Colombia
 Epargyreus cruza Evans, 1952 - Mexico
 Epargyreus deleoni Freeman, 1977 - Mexico
 Epargyreus dicta Evans, 1952 - Bolivia
 Epargyreus enispe (Hewitson, 1867) - Colombia, Brazil
 E. enispe enispe (Hewitson, 1874) - Brazil
 E. enispe elta Evans, 1952 - Bolivia
 Epargyreus exadeus (Cramer, [1780]) – broken silverdrop – Guatemala, Honduras, Nicaragua, Panama, Colombia, Suriname, Brazil, Argentina, Trinidad
 Epargyreus nutra Evans, 1952 - Colombia
 Epargyreus orizaba Scudder, 1872 - Mexico, Guatemala
 Epargyreus pseudexadeus Westwood, 1852 - Brazil (Minas Gerais)
 Epargyreus socus (Hübner, [1825])
 E. socus socus (Hübner, [1825]) 
 E. socus chota  Evans, 1952 - Trinidad
 E. socus sinus Evans, 1952 - Brazil (Pará)
 Epargyreus spanna Evans, 1952 - Dominican Republic
 Epargyreus spina Evans, 1952
 E. spina spina Evans, 1952 - Mexico, Colombia
 E. spina verruga Evans, 1952 - Peru
 Epargyreus spinosa Evans, 1952 - Mexico
 Epargyreus spinta Evans, 1952 - Colombia
 Epargyreus tmolis (Burmeister, 1875) - Argentina, Paraguay
 Epargyreus windi Freeman, 1969 - Mexico
 Epargyreus zestos (Geyer, 1832) – zestos skipper – Antilles, Florida
 E. zestos zestos (Geyer, 1832) Florida, Saint Thomas
 E. zestos inaguarum Clench & Bjorndal, 1980 Bahamas

References

External links
images representing Epargyreus at Consortium for the Barcode of Life

Hesperiidae genera
Hesperiidae of South America
Taxa named by Jacob Hübner
Eudaminae